Ethnic groups in Chinese history refer to various or presumed ethnicities of significance to the history of China, gathered through the study of Classical Chinese literature, Chinese and non-Chinese literary sources and inscriptions, historical linguistics, and archaeological research.

Among the difficulties in the study of ethnic groups in China are the relatively long periods of time involved, together with the large volume of literary and historical records which have accompanied the history of China. Classical Chinese ethnography (like much premodern ethnography) was often sketchy, leaving it unclear as to whether Chinese-depicted names referred to a true ethnic group or a possibly multiethnic political entity. Even then, ethnonyms were sometimes assigned by geographic location or surrounding features, rather than by any features of the people themselves, and often carried little distinction of who the Han Chinese authors considered Chinese and non-Chinese for differences such as lifestyle, language, or governance. Many of the ethnonyms were historically used in such a way as to invite comparison with the word barbarian.

English names

The Chinese exonyms of various ethnic groups encountered in Chinese history can be rendered into English either by transliteration or translation; for instance, Dí 狄 is transliterated as Di (or Ti) or translated as "Northern Barbarians". In some cases authors prefer to transliterate specific exonyms as proper nouns, and in other cases to translate generic ones as English "barbarian" (for instance, "Four Barbarians"). The American sinologist Marc S. Abramson explains why "barbarian" is the appropriate translation for general terms like fan 番 and hu 胡, but not specific ones like fancai 番菜 "foreign-style food".
Translations such as "foreigner" and "alien," though possessing an air of scholarly neutrality, are inappropriate as a general translation because they primarily connote geographic and political outsiderness, implying that individuals and groups so designated were external to the Tang Empire and ineligible to become subjects of the empire. This was frequently not the case with many uses of fan and related terms — most common among them were hu (often used in the Tang to denote Central Asians) and four ethnonyms of great antiquity that, by the Tang, were mostly used generically with implicit geographic connotations: yi (east), man (south), rong (west), and di (north) — that largely connoted cultural and ethnic otherness but did not exclude the designated persons or groups from membership in the empire. Although the term barbarian has undergone many transformations from its Greek origins to its current English usage, not all of which are relevant to the Tang (such as its use in medieval Europe to denote religious difference, marking non-Christians of various ethnic, geographic, and political affiliations), its consistent association with inferiority, lack of civilization, and externality in the broadest sense often make it the most appropriate choice, including some cases when it is placed in the mouths of non-Han referring to themselves or others. However, its pejorative connotations make it inappropriate as a general translation. Thus, I have chosen not to translate these terms when they designate particular groups, individuals, or phenomena and do not refer to a specific ethnic group, language, geographic place, or cultural complex.

List of ethnic groups

The following table summarizes the various ethnic groups and/or other social groups of known historical significance to the history of China (any non clear-cut connection is denoted by a question mark):

See also
Barbarian
Ethnic minorities in China
Graphic pejoratives in written Chinese
History of China
List of ethnic groups in China
Secession in China
Wu Hu

References

Citations

Sources 

 Books
 Abramson, Marc S. (2008). Ethnic Identity in Tang China. University of Pennsylvania Press.
 Beckwith, Christopher I. (2009): Empires of the Silk Road: A History of Central Eurasia from the Bronze Age to the Present.  Princeton: Princeton University Press. .
 Wu, K. C. (1982). The Chinese Heritage. New York: Crown Publishers. .

External links

 
 
Separatism in China